Three Months in the Southern States is a book written by Captain  Arthur Fremantle, of the Coldstream Guards, upon his return to England from his three-month stay (April 2 until July 16, 1863) in the Confederate States of America.

Most specifically mentioned in the book are Fremantle's travels through Texas, the deep south, and finally when he arrived in the company of the Army of Northern Virginia on June 27, and witnessed the Battle of Gettysburg firsthand, as part of a cadre of foreign observers attached to the headquarters of Lt. Gen. James Longstreet.

When published, the book became a best seller in both Britain and America, both North and South, but was then forgotten until its reissue on the eve of the centenary of the American Civil War.

External links
 Online version of Three Months in the Southern States.

1864 non-fiction books
American Civil War memoirs
British memoirs